= Isa Oomayoualook =

Inuk sculptor

- Born: 1915; Nunavik
- Died: 1976 (aged 60–61); Inukjuak, Nunavik

Isa Oomayoualook was an Inuk sculptor.

His work is included in the collections of the Musée national des beaux-arts du Québec and the Canadian Museum of History
